The 2013 BNP Paribas Masters was a professional men's tennis tournament that was played on indoor hard courts. It was the 41st edition of the tournament, which is part of the 2013 ATP World Tour. It took place at the Palais omnisports de Paris-Bercy in Paris, France, between 28 October and 3 November 2013. Second-seeded Novak Djokovic won the singles title.

Points and prize money

Point distribution

Prize money

Singles main-draw entrants

Singles seeds
The following are the seeded players. Ranking and seeding are according to ATP rankings on 21 October 2013. Accumulated points are according to ATP website on 28 October 2013.

Withdrawn players

Other entrants
The following players received wildcards into the singles main draw:
  Michaël Llodra
  Nicolas Mahut
  Adrian Mannarino

The following player received entry as a special exempt:
  Édouard Roger-Vasselin

The following players received entry from the qualifying draw:
  Santiago Giraldo
  Robin Haase
  Pierre-Hugues Herbert
  Michał Przysiężny
  Igor Sijsling
  Bernard Tomic

The following player received entry as a lucky loser:
  Pablo Andújar

Withdrawals
Before the tournament
  Jürgen Melzer
  Juan Mónaco
  Gaël Monfils
  Sam Querrey
  Tommy Robredo
  Janko Tipsarević
  Robin Söderling

Doubles main-draw entrants

Seeds

 Rankings are as of 21 October 2013

Other entrants
The following pairs received wildcards into the doubles main draw:
  Kenny de Schepper /  Pierre-Hugues Herbert
  Adrian Mannarino /  Gaël Monfils

Finals

Singles

 Novak Djokovic defeated  David Ferrer 7–5, 7–5

Doubles

 Bob Bryan /  Mike Bryan defeated  Alexander Peya /  Bruno Soares 6–3, 6–3

References

External links
 Official website
 ATP tournament profile